On 18 December 1963, a number of students from Ghana and other African countries organized a protest on Moscow's Red Square (Russian SFSR, USSR) in response to the alleged murder of the medical student Edmund Assare-Addo. The number of participants was reported at 500–700, but the Ghanaian physician Edward Na, who participated in the events, claimed there were at most 150 protesters. The ambassador of Ghana in the Soviet Union John Banks Elliott requested militsiya protection of the Ghanaian embassy.

This was the first recorded political protest on the Red Square since the late 1920s.

Background
Edmund Assare-Addo was a 29-year-old student of the Kalinin Medical Institute. His body was found in a stretch of wasteland along a country road leading to the Moscow Ring Road. African students alleged that he was knifed by a Soviet man because Assare-Addo was courting a Russian woman. The African students based their allegation on the unlikelihood of a student venturing into that remote place. The Soviet authorities stated that Assare-Addo froze to death in the snow while drunk. According to the autopsy, performed by Soviet medics with two advanced medical students from Ghana as observers, the death was "an effect of cold in a state of alcohol-induced stupor". No signs of physical trauma were found, with the possible exception of a small scar on the neck.

Discussing the protest with Soviet officials, Elliot indicated the Western embassies in Moscow ("the U.S., England, France, the FRG, or even Holland") as the probable instigators of the protest. Elliot went so far as to suggest that students who "behaved poorly" and "skipped class" should be expelled from the Soviet Union. Before the students' march to the Red Square, Elliott alleged that the students broke into the Ghanaian embassy and damaged furniture and pictures.

Protest

The protesters were African students studying at Soviet universities and institutes. Having assembled on the morning of 18 December 1963, they wrote a memorandum to present to Soviet authorities. The protesters carried placards with the slogans "Moscow – center of discrimination", "Stop killing Africans!" and "Moscow, a second Alabama", while shouting in English, Russian, and French. The protesters marched to the Spasskiye Gates of the Kremlin, where they posed for photographs and gave interviews to Western correspondents. The Soviet TASS news agency responded with a statement: "It is to be regretted that the meetings of the Ghanaian students which began in connection with their claims to the embassy of their country resulted in the disturbance of public order in Moscow streets. It is quite natural that this is resented by the Russian people".

On 20 December, the students returned to classes and the militsiya ceased the protection of the Ghanaian embassy.

References

1963 protests
1963 in international relations
1963 in the Soviet Union
1963 in Moscow
Red Square
Student protests in Russia
Protests in the Soviet Union
Diplomatic incidents
Ghana–Russia relations
Protests in Russia
Racism in the Soviet Union